"Fallin' Over You" is a song recorded by Canadian country artist Chad Brownlee. The song was co-written by Dennis Matkosky, Terry Sawchuk, and Matt Alderman. It was the second single from Brownlee's third studio album The Fighters.

Music video
The music video was directed by Carolyne Stossel and premiered on April 3, 2014. The video features Brownlee singing and playing the guitar in the air on a passenger plane, in a deserted area, and with his band on the back of a destroyed aircraft.

Charts
"Fallin' Over You" reached a peak of #10 on Billboard Canada Country chart, becoming his sixth Top 10 hit. It peaked at #66 on the Canadian Hot 100, marking his highest charting entry there.

References

2014 songs
2014 singles
Chad Brownlee songs